William C. McGann (April 15, 1893 – November 15, 1977) was an American film director. He directed more than 50 films between 1930 and 1942. He was born in Pittsburgh, Pennsylvania and died in Los Angeles, California.

Partial filmography

 When the Clouds Roll By (1919)
 The Mollycoddle (1920)
 The Mark of Zorro (1920)
 Three Ages (1923)
 Footloose Widows (1926)
 The Stolen Jools (1931)
 I Like Your Nerve (1931)
 Illegal (1932)
 A Voice Said Goodnight  (1932)
 Her Night Out (1932)
 Little Fella (1933)
 Times Square Playboy (1936)
 Two Against the World (1936)
 Penrod and Sam (1937)
 Marry the Girl (1937)
 Sh! The Octopus (1937)
 Girls on Probation (1938)
 Blackwell's Island (1939)
 Everybody's Hobby (1939)
 Dr. Christian Meets the Women (1940)
 A Shot in the Dark (1941)
 Highway West (1941)
 Tombstone, the Town Too Tough to Die (1942)

References

External links

1893 births
1977 deaths
Artists from Pittsburgh
Film directors from Pennsylvania